Sir Simeon Stuart, 3rd Baronet ( c.1721–1779),  was a British Army officer and politician who sat in the House of Commons from 1761 to 1779.

Stuart was born the son of Sir Simeon Stuart, 2nd Baronet and his wife Elizabeth Dereham, daughter of Sir Richard Dereham baronets, 3rd Baronet, and educated at Westminster School between 1734 and 1737.  He succeeded to the baronetcy on the death of his father on 11 August 1761 and also succeeded his father as Chamberlain of the Exchequer the same year.

Stuart canvassed for a seat in Parliament for Hampshire for several months from August 1754 but, perceiving he stood no chance, yielded the seat to Lord Winchester when he was also put up. However, in the 1761 general election he was successfully returned as Member of Parliament for Hampshire. He was also re-elected in the 1768 and 1774 general elections.

Stuart died on 19 Nov. 1779. He had married Miss Hooke, daughter of Lt.-Col. William Hooke, Governor of Minorca and was succeeded by his only son Sir Simeon Stuart, 4th Baronet.

References

1723 births
1779 deaths
People educated at Westminster School, London
Members of the Parliament of Great Britain for English constituencies
British MPs 1761–1768
British MPs 1768–1774
British MPs 1774–1780
Baronets in the Baronetage of England